Alvin Colt (July 5, 1916 – May 4, 2008) was an American costume designer. Colt worked on over 50 Broadway shows.

His first job was in a theatrical fabric house, he also worked on painting scenery during the summer. On the Town was the first Broadway show he worked on in 1944.  His major Broadway credits include  Guys and Dolls, Top Banana, Fanny, Finian's Rainbow, Six Characters in Search of an Author, Destry Rides Again, Wildcat, Here's Love, The Crucible, The Goodbye People, Sugar, Lorelei, Jerome Robbins' Broadway and Waiting in the Wings for producer Alexander H. Cohen, with whom he had a long working relationship.  Alvin won a Tony Award in 1955 for Pipe Dream. He did the costumes for the 1957 show, Rumple.  The last official show he worked on was in 2001 for If you ever leave me...I'm going with you!

Colt also designed for TV and film.  Among his screen credits are costume designs for the films Top Banana, Stiletto and Li'l Abner and for the TV productions of The Enchanted Nutcracker, Kiss Me Kate, The Adams Chronicles, CBS: On the Air, Happy 100th Birthday, Hollywood and many years of the Tony Awards.   Alvin also designed the children's musical Treehouse Trolls Birthday Day for Goodtimes Entertainment.

He was inducted into the American Theatre Hall of Fame in 2002.

In 2007 the Museum of the City of New York offered the exhibition "Costumes and Characters: The Designs of Alvin Colt," and the museum is now the home of many of his costume sketches.

Colt died of natural causes on May 4, 2008, in New York City.

Awards and nominations

References

External links

 Alvin Colt designs, 1935-1990, held by the Billy Rose Theatre Division, New York Public Library for the Performing Arts

1916 births
2008 deaths
American costume designers
Tony Award winners